Middletown Bridge, also known as Shelby County Bridge #149, is a historic stone arch bridge located in Liberty Township, Shelby County, Indiana. It was built in 1903, and is a four-arch bridge constructed of Indiana limestone.  It measures 140.8 feet long and 20 feet wide, including the parapet walls. The bridge was torn down by the county in the summer of 2018.

It was listed on the National Register of Historic Places in 2009.

References

Road bridges on the National Register of Historic Places in Indiana
Bridges completed in 1903
Transportation buildings and structures in Shelby County, Indiana
National Register of Historic Places in Shelby County, Indiana
Stone arch bridges in the United States